Heydarabad (also Romanized as Ḩeydarābād; also known as Hemmatābād and Ḩeydarābād-e ‘Abbāsī) is a village in Vardasht Rural District, in the Central District of Semirom County, Isfahan Province, Iran. At the 2006 census, its population was 94, in 23 families.

References 

Populated places in Semirom County